Banian (َUrdu & Pashto بانیاں) is a town, and one of twenty union councils in Battagram District in the Khyber Pukhtunkhwa of Pakistan. The place was named by Bania (caste)  of Narrore, while they formerly ruled the Jirgah System Kingdom for centuries. It is located at 34°36'30N 73°3'15E and has an altitude of 1497 metres (4911 feet).

References

Union councils of Battagram District
Populated places in Battagram District